Letter from Egypt is the fourth studio album by Norwegian singer Morten Harket, released on May 19, 2008. It is his first album since 1996 and second sung in the English language. The album entered the Norwegian Top 40 Album Chart at number one on week 22 (chart published May 26, 2008).

Singles
"Movies" was released as the lead single in Norway on November 15, 2007). The second single, "Darkspace (You're With Me)" was released in Norway on April 4, 2008, and in Germany on May 16, 2008. The German edition includes the bonus track "All Of You Concerned", an English version of the song "Jeg kjenner ingen fremtid" from Morten Harket's third studio album and second Norwegian album Vogts Villa (1996). "We'll Never Speak Again" was released as the third single on June 6, 2008 in Norway.

Notable performances 
On 11 December 2007 Morten Harket performed at the Nobel Peace Prize Concert in Oslo, Norway. He played two songs: the title track "Letter from Egypt", and "Movies".

On 20 May, 21 May and 22 May 2008, Morten Harket, along with the other two a-ha members Paul Waaktaar-Savoy and Magne Furuholmen, played three concerts at Rockefeller Music Hall in Oslo to promote their solo material. They also played the same show at Royal Albert Hall in London, England on Saturday 24 May.

Track listing
 All tracks produced by Kjetil Bjerkestrand and co-produced by Morten Harket. Additional production on "Darkspace" and "With You - With Me" by Addi 800 and Petur Jonsson.

"Shooting Star" is replaced with "Slanted Floor" on international editions.

Morten Harket albums
2008 albums
Polydor Records albums